Kosovo made its Winter Olympics debut at the 2018 Winter Olympics in Pyeongchang, South Korea, from 9 to 25 February 2018, with one competitor.

Competitors
The following is the list of number of competitors participating in the delegation per sport.

Alpine skiing 

Kosovo qualified one male alpine skier.

See also
Kosovo at the 2018 Summer Youth Olympics

References

Nations at the 2018 Winter Olympics
2018
2018 in Kosovan sport